Syntarsus is a generic name that has been used for the following taxa:
Syntarsus a junior synonym of the Colydiinae beetle genus Cerchanotus Erichson, 1845.
Syntarsus kayentakatae is the former name of a theropod dinosaur later classified as Megapnosaurus, but is now not definitively assigned to any specific genus.
Syntarsus rhodesiensis is the former name of a theropod dinosaur later classified as Megapnosaurus.